Tealby is a village and civil parish in the West Lindsey district of Lincolnshire, England, situated on the edge of the Lincolnshire Wolds and  north-east of Market Rasen. The population of the civil parish at the 2011 census was 593.

Community
Tealby is noted for the Tennyson d'Eyncourt family, which provided the village hall and school. In the 1980s the school was used for filming the programme Nanny.

In the early 2000s the village was granted permission for a shop to be built, now run by volunteers. The village post office was threatened with closure but it is open at certain times of the week.
Tealby church, built using local orange-iron stone, is dedicated to All Saints and dates back to the 12th century; it holds memorials to the Tennyson d'Eyncourt family. Tealby residents included Bernie Taupin, who lived on Beck Hill (Elton John recorded a song about "Tealby Abbey" on Regimental Sgt Zippo).

The King's Head, one of two public houses in the village, is one of the oldest in the country and retains a thatched roof.

Tealby has a Bowls Club and a Lawn Tennis Club, the courts of which are a facility for the wider district, the club promoting a Young Leaders Tennis Course and competitions. The village hall, run by a committee, is used for parties, social events, playgroups, school events and meetings.

Bayons Manor 
Tealby's Bayons Manor was once owned by Charles Tennyson, later Tennyson d'Eyncourt, the uncle of Alfred, Lord Tennyson. The estate was purchased in 1944 by a local farmer, primarily for the farmland since the house was already derelict and becoming dangerous. Because of its dangerous condition a subsequent owner had it demolished in 1964. Bayons Manor was a rare example of a Victorian stately home in the style of a moated castle.

Tealby Hoard
In 1807 a ploughman working for George Tennyson uncovered an earthenware pot containing a hoard of some 6000 silver coins. These were examined by Sir Joseph Banks, 604 retained for collectors and reference and 5127 melted down at the Tower Mint. The Tealby pennies have been historically important in numismatics, showing development of Medieval coinage in England.

Etymology
For a long time the placename Tealby has been attributed to Anglo-Saxon tæfl/tefl "gaming-board", here for a square piece of land, plus Old Norse -bȳ "dwelling". But there are old spellings Tavelesbi, Tauelesbi and Teflesbi, and the Anglo-Saxon word tæfl is feminine and so its genitive would be tæfle, and it is suspected that the name refers to some Taifali (a horse-riding Germanic or Sarmatian people) who invaded Gaul or were brought into Gaul by Romans as mercenaries and later crossed to Britain with the Anglo-Saxons.

References

External links

Tealby Watermill
www.thisistealby.com

Villages in Lincolnshire
Civil parishes in Lincolnshire
West Lindsey District